Southern Angami or Japfüphiki  is a geo-cultural region located in the southern part of Kohima District in the state of Nagaland in India with a portion of its territory also lying across the inter-state border in the Senapati District of Manipur.

History
Kigwema
and Viswema are considered to be the oldest settlements of the
Angami Nagas. Numerous villages have branched out from these two ancestral
settlements.

In 1944, the Southern Angami Public Organization was formed to protect and safeguard the territories of the Southern Angamis.

Geography
The region is bounded on the south by the Mao Nagas on the south west by the Maram Nagas, on the west by Zeliangrongs and the Western Angamis, on the north by the Northern Angamis and on the east by the Chakhesang Nagas.

Towns and Villages under Southern Angami
Viswema
Jakhama
Khuzama
Kigwema
Phesama
Kidima
Mima
Mitelephe
Pfuchama
Kezoma
Chakhabama
Kezo Town

Culture

Events
Hornbill Festival

The Hornbill Festival is held every year at Kisama in the month of December. The festival is considered to be the biggest in Northeast India.
St. Joseph's College, Jakhama Spring Fest
The St. Joseph's College, Jakhama Spring Fest is the biggest college fest in Nagaland.

Local festivals
 Te–l Khukhu
 
Te–l Khukhu is a festival that falls on 13 July (Chünyi). It is a time of giving and sharing of food with each other. This is the only festival dedicated for girls.

Places of interests
Dzüko Valley
Mount Japfü
Mount Tempü
Teyozwü Hill

Education
Southern Angami region is home to some of the most prestigious educational institutions in Nagaland.

College and University
 St. Joseph's College, Jakhama
 Japfü Christian College, Kigwema

Schools
John Government Higher Secondary School, Viswema
St. Joseph's Higher Secondary School, Viswema
Viswema Baptist School, Viswema
Loyola School, Jakhama
St. Paul School, Phesama

Politics
Southern Angami region of Kohima district assumes significance in the history of Nagaland Legislative Assembly as it produced the first opposition leader Vizol Angami in 1964.
 
The region is divided into two constituencies namely 14 AC Southern Angami—I and 15 AC Southern Angami–II.

See also
 Angami Naga
 Angami language
 Chakhesang Naga

References

Kohima district
Geography of Nagaland
Geography of Manipur
Senapati district